250 (two hundred [and] fifty) is the natural number following 249 and preceding 251.

250 is also the sum of squares of the divisors of the number 14.

References

Integers